Donnini is a family name of Italian origin. It may refer to: 

 Dennis Donnini, British soldier
 Dionigi Donnini, Italian painter 
 Girolamo Donnini, Italian painter
 Giulio Donnini, Italian actor
 Jim Donini, rock climber

Italian-language surnames